Mathighatta is a central location in Karnataka, India for many local villages including: Keresanthe Sri Mahalakshmi devi Temple, Kurubarahalli, Kurubarahalli Thanda,  Devarahalli, Banjenahalli, Kavalipura, Beeranahalli, Dasarahalli, Madalu, Sadarahalli, Huligondi, Lakkenahalli, Lakkenalli Thanda, G karehally, Kariyanahalli, Kuppalu and Chilanahalli,

Facilities 

Facilities include: Primary Health Center, Vijaya Bank with ATM, Electricity (MESCOM) Maintenance Centre, BSNL telephone exchange,  government and private schools, a library, a small Post Office and BCM Girls Hostel. All the basic essential items are easily available with so many shops.
 
SKR High School was popular during the early 1970s and 1980s. Most of the high school students were natives of Mathighatta and neighboring villages.
Niveditha Higher Primary School. giving English education, at a low cost as compared to the towns.
Apart from natives of Mathighatta, most of the government servants working in and around the local villages reside here.

It is well connected by road (NH206), bus facility is good . All the KSRTC buses stop here (until 2013 only Chikkamagaluru division buses used to stop here, after that because of protest headed by college students with help of villagers (all the buses stop here now), mainly to facilitate transport of school/college students to Kadur or Banavara during the daytime. And also 10 surrounded village people came here go to bus.

Problems 

Since the main highway passes through this village, it is prone to road accidents. For example, even the primary school buildings are on both sides of highway, leading to schoolchildren crossing the road. Here lot of water scarcity for pupils and cattle.

The water supply and street lighting are maintained by the panchayath.
Almost every agricultural family owns a bore well, most of which dry up during the summer. This causes severe water problems for the villagers and livestock.

Major crops 

Major crops include: coconuts, groundnuts, vegetables, sunflowers, ragi and hurali.

Temples 
Mathigatta is a very holy place by Bhanashankari Amma temple, where every year there will be fest (Jatra) in the month of March. All the villagers surrounding mathigatta will join together and celebrate this fest.

Cities and towns in Bangalore Rural district